The 1984–85 Austrian Hockey League season was the 55th season of the Austrian Hockey League, the top level of ice hockey in Austria. Seven teams participated in the league, and EC KAC won the championship.

First round

Final round

Playoffs

Semifinals
EHC Lustenau - EC KAC 1:2 (6:2, 3:5, 3:6)
EV Innsbruck - VEU Feldkirch 2:1 (9:3, 2:3 OT, 8:1)

Final
EV Innsbruck - EC KAC 0:2 (2:6, 2:5)

External links
Austrian Ice Hockey Association

Austria
Austrian Hockey League seasons
League